Fourteen people have served as Minister for Home Affairs of Malta since the office was established in 1976.

Political parties

See also
Government of Malta

Sources
Maltese ministries, etc – Rulers.org

Home
Home Ministers
Politicians